In the 2019–20 season, Al-Duhail is competing in the Qatar Stars League for the 9th season, as well as the Emir of Qatar Cup and the Champions League.

Squad list
Players and squad numbers last updated on 20 September 2019.Note: Flags indicate national team as has been defined under FIFA eligibility rules. Players may hold more than one non-FIFA nationality.

Competitions

Overview

{| class="wikitable" style="text-align: center"
|-
!rowspan=2|Competition
!colspan=8|Record
!rowspan=2|Started round
!rowspan=2|Final position / round
!rowspan=2|First match	
!rowspan=2|Last match
|-
!
!
!
!
!
!
!
!
|-
| Qatar Stars League

| Matchday 1
| style="background:gold;"|Winner
| 21 August 2019
| 20 August 2020
|-
| Emir of Qatar Cup

| Round of 16 
| Quarter-finals 
| 6 February 2020
| 14 March 2020
|-
| Qatar Crown Prince Cup

| Semi-finals
| style="background:silver;"|Runners–up
| 10 January 2020
| 17 January 2020
|-
| Sheikh Jassim Cup

| Final 
| style="background:silver;"|Runners–up
| colspan=2| 17 August 2019
|-
| Champions League

| colspan=2|Round of 16
| 6 August 2019
| 13 August 2019
|-
| Champions League

| colspan=2|Group stage
| 11 February 2020
| 18 February 2020
|-
! Total

Qatar Stars League

League table

Results summary

Results by round

Matches

Sheikh Jassim Cup

Emir of Qatar Cup

Qatar Cup (ex) Crown Prince Cup

2019 AFC Champions League

Knockout stage

Round of 16

2020 AFC Champions League

Group stage

Group C

Squad information

Playing statistics

|-

|-
! colspan=16 style=background:#dcdcdc; text-align:center| Players transferred out during the season

Goalscorers
Includes all competitive matches. The list is sorted alphabetically by surname when total goals are equal.

Transfers

In

Out

Notes

References

Al-Duhail SC seasons
Qatari football clubs 2019–20 season